Erik Brahe (Stockholm, 23 June 1722 – 23 July 1756, Stockholm), was a Swedish count.  He was executed for treason as one of the conspirators participating in the failed coup d'etat of queen Louisa Ulrika, the Coup of 1756.

He was the son of count Nils Brahe and Fredrika Vilhelmina Stenbock. He married 1745 to Eva Catharina Sack (1727–1753) and 1754 to Stina Piper, and became the father of Per Eriksson Brahe and Magnus Fredrik Brahe.  Early on, he became a member of the Hovpartiet, with the goal to reintroduce absolute monarchy. He participated in the queen's failed Coup of 1756. He was judged guilty of treason and executed.

References
Eric Brahe i Svenskt biografiskt lexikon (art av Erik Naumann)

External links

1722 births
1756 deaths
Executed Swedish people
People executed by Sweden by decapitation
18th-century Swedish people
18th-century executions by Sweden
People executed for treason against Sweden
Age of Liberty people
Swedish courtiers